#Twice (Hashtag Twice) is the first Japanese compilation album by South Korean girl group Twice. It is a compilation album consisting of both Korean and Japanese-language versions of the group's first five singles. It was released on June 28, 2017, by Warner Music Japan.

The album surpassed 100,000 unit sales within four days since its release, and sold a total of 136,157 physical copies on its first week sales. It recorded over 200,000 unit sales on Oricon Albums Chart in less than a month and in less than two months, it sold over 260,000 copies, earning it a Platinum certification by the Recording Industry Association of Japan (RIAJ).

Background and release
In early February 2017, Twice launched their Japanese website and other social media channels. Large photos and ads of Twice were seen on the walls of busy shopping districts and subway station in Tokyo on February 8. On February 24, they officially announced that their Japanese debut was set for June 28, 2017. It was revealed then that they would release a compilation album titled #Twice which consists of 10 songs including both Korean and Japanese-language versions of "Like Ooh-Ahh", "Cheer Up" and "TT." On the same day, five Japanese morning programs informed viewers of the upcoming debut and featured Twice in an interview.

On May 31, Twice released details of the album, including the track listing. It has three versions: Standard Edition, First Press Limited Edition A (CD and photo book) and Limited Edition B (CD and DVD).

On June 7, Warner Music Japan uploaded a short recording video of Twice for the Japanese version of "Like Ooh-Ahh" on YouTube. A week later, Twice digitally released "Signal (Japanese ver.)", along with the short version of its music video, as a preview and countdown to album release. #Twice was officially released on June 28. It was also released as a digital download in EP format on various portals, including South Korean music sites distributed by Genie Music, containing the five Japanese-language songs.

Promotion
On June 14, 2017, it was announced that Twice would have a collaboration with Shibuya 109 store's 109 Summer Sale campaign for 2017 to mark the album release of #Twice. The store hosted pop-up stores called #Twice Pop-up Store and #Twice Gallery at its Tokyo and Osaka branches throughout July. They also launched a promotion campaign with Tokyo Tower. On June 29–30, letters "TT", which represent the title track, were displayed in bright pink lighting on the Japanese tourist destination.

The group performed "TT (Japanese ver.)" for the first time on a television program on the June 30th episode of Music Station, the first South Korean girl group to perform on the show since 2012. They appeared on the two-hour special episode along with Exile The Second, Kanjani8, Keyakizaka46, Dean Fujioka, Tomoyo Harada and Hey! Say! JUMP.

On July 2, Twice held their two-part debut showcase titled Touchdown in Japan in Tokyo Metropolitan Gymnasium, where they performed their first five Japanese songs, "Touchdown" from Page Two, "Jelly Jelly" and "One in a Million" from Twicecoaster: Lane 1 and a medley of their first five Korean singles. It was attended by a total of 15,000 people.

Twice greeted more than 10,000 fans through a "Hi-Touch", an event where you can share high fives and handshakes in a close position with the band members, held at Makuhari Messe in Mihama-ku, Chiba on August 5 and at Intex Osaka in Suminoe-ku, Osaka on August 6.

Commercial performance
#Twice debuted at number 2 on the Oricon Daily Album Chart on June 27, 2017, selling 46,871 physical copies. It then claimed the top spot of the daily chart on its fifth day. The album charted at number 2 on Oricon Weekly Album Chart, which sold 136,157 units, the highest first week album sales among K-pop artists in Japan in the last two years. On Oricon Digital Album Chart, it debuted at number 1 with 6,295 download count. It also peaked at number 2 on Billboard Japan Hot Albums recorded 137,642 copies sold and was charted for 25 weeks in 2017.

On July 6, it was reported that over 210,000 copies of #Twice were shipped out within a week since its release. On December 4, it was announced that it topped Tower Records Japan's 2017 best-selling domestic albums by K-pop artists. The album exceeded 326,400 shipments on February 23, 2018.

According to Billboard, #Twice is also the group's most-consumed album in the United States—which accounts for streaming and sales—with 69,000 equivalent album units. This is likely due to the fact it was available on all streaming platforms, like Spotify where the group's full Korean discography was only added in 2018, as one of the few ways for fans to listen to their hit songs, even if in Japanese.

Track listing

Personnel
Credits adapted from album liner notes.

JYP Entertainment staff

 Song Ji-eun "Shannen" (JYP Entertainment Japan) – executive producer
 Jimmy Jeong (JYP Entertainment) – executive producer
 J. Y. Park "The Asiansoul" – producer, all instruments, keyboards and computer programming (on "Signal (Japanese ver.)" and "Signal")
 Sim Eun-jee – assistant producer
 Min Lee "collapsedone" – assistant producer, all instruments and computer programming (on "Knock Knock (Japanese ver.)" and "Knock Knock")
 Kim Seung-soo – assistant producer, all instruments, keyboards and computer programming (on "Signal (Japanese ver.)" and "Signal")
 Armadillo – assistant producer (JYP Publishing), all instruments, keyboards and computer programming (on "Signal (Japanese ver.)" and "Signal")
 Park Nam-yong (JYP Entertainment) – choreographer
 Kim Hyung-woong (JYP Entertainment) – choreographer
 Yun Hee-soo (JYP Entertainment) – choreographer
 Na Tae-hoon (JYP Entertainment) – choreographer
 Yoo Kwang-yeol (JYP Entertainment) – choreographer
 Kang Da-sol (JYP Entertainment) – choreographer
 Lee Tae-sub (JYP Entertainment) – recording engineer
 Choi Hye-jin (JYP Entertainment) – recording engineer
 Eom Se-hee (JYP Entertainment) – recording engineer
 Lim Hong-jin (JYP Entertainment) – recording engineer
 Jang Han-soo (JYP Entertainment) – recording engineer

Japanese version recording staff
 Goei Ito (Obelisk) – recording director
 Yu-ki Kokubo (Obelisk) – recording director
 Satoshi Sasamoto – Pro Tools operation

Design staff

 Toshiyuki Suzuki (United Lounge Tokyo) – art direction
 Yasuhiro Uaeda (United Lounge Tokyo) – design
 Takaki Kumada – photography
 Valet – jacket photo style director
 Choi Hee-sun (F.Choi) – music video style director
 Lim Ji-hyun (F.Choi) – music video style director
 F.Choi – music video style director
 Lee Jin-young (F.Choi) – assistant stylist
 Ju Young-suk (F.Choi) – assistant stylist
 Heo Su-yeon (F.Choi) – assistant stylist
 Park Nae-joo – hair director
 Kim Se-gyeong – hair director
 Han So-hee – assistant hair director
 Kim Hwa-yeon – assistant hair director
 Won Jung-yo – makeup director
 Choi Su-ji – assistant makeup director
 Jung You-jung – assistant makeup director

Movie staff

 Jimmy (BS Pictures) – music video director ("TT (Japanese ver.)")
 Kim Young-jo (Naive Creative Production) – music video director ("Signal (Japanese ver.)")
 Yoo Seung-woo (Naive Creative Production) – music video director ("Signal (Japanese ver.)")
 Taikou Nakamura – making music video director ("Like Ooh-Ahh (Japanese ver.)")
 Han Gui-taek – jacket shooting making movie director ("#Twice"), music video making movie director ("TT (Japanese ver.)"), music video making movie director ("Signal (Japanese ver.)")
 Yu Yamaguchi (Warner Music Mastering) – DVD authoring

Other personnel

 Rado – all instruments and computer programming (on "Like Ooh-Ahh (Japanese ver.)", "Cheer Up (Japanese ver.)", "TT (Japanese ver.)", "Like Ooh-Ahh", "Cheer Up" and "TT")
 Joe J. Lee "Kairos" – all instruments, keyboards, computer programming and vocal production (on "Signal (Japanese ver.)" and "Signal")
 Hobyn "K.O" Yi – additional engineering and vocal production (on "Signal (Japanese ver.)" and "Signal")
 Jihyo – background vocals (on "Like Ooh-Ahh (Japanese ver.)", "Cheer Up (Japanese ver.)", "TT (Japanese ver.)", "Knock Knock (Japanese ver.)", "Like Ooh-Ahh", "Cheer Up" and "TT")
 Nayeon – background vocals (on "TT (Japanese ver.)", "Knock Knock (Japanese ver.)" and "TT")
 Ikuko Tsutsumi – background vocals (on "Like Ooh-Ahh (Japanese ver.)", "Cheer Up (Japanese ver.)", "TT (Japanese ver.)", "Knock Knock (Japanese ver.)" and "Signal (Japanese ver.)")
 Mayu Wakisaka – background vocals (on "Knock Knock (Japanese ver.)" and "Knock Knock") and vocal recording director (on "Knock Knock (Japanese ver.)")
 Esther Park "Legaci" – background vocals (on "Signal" and "Signal (Japanese ver.)")
 Kim Yong-woon "Goodear" – recording engineer (on "Like Ooh-Ahh" and "Cheer Up") and mixing engineer (on "Knock Knock (Japanese ver.)" and "Knock Knock")
 fabiotheasian – recording engineer and assistant mixing engineer (on "Like Ooh-Ahh") 
 Wes Koz – assistant recording engineer (on "Signal (Japanese ver.)" and "Signal")
 Han Chul-kyu – assistant recording engineer (on "Like Ooh-Ahh")
 Jang Hong-seok – assistant recording engineer (on "Cheer Up")
 Park Sang-rok – assistant recording engineer (on "TT")
 Samuel J Lee "Swish" – vocal production (on "Signal (Japanese ver.)" and "Signal")
 Lee Tae-sub – mixing engineer (on "Like Ooh-Ahh (Japanese ver.)", "Cheer Up (Japanese ver.)", "TT (Japanese ver.)", "Like Ooh-Ahh", "Cheer Up" and "TT")
 Choi Hye-jin – assistant mixing engineer (on "Cheer Up (Japanese ver.)", "TT (Japanese ver.)", "Cheer Up" and "TT")
 Tony Maserati – mixing engineer (on "Signal (Japanese ver.)" and "Signal")
 Miles Comaskey – assistant mixing engineer (on "Signal (Japanese ver.)" and "Signal")
 Kwon Nam-woo – mastering engineer (on "Like Ooh-Ahh (Japanese ver.)", "Cheer Up (Japanese ver.)" and "TT (Japanese ver.)")
 Park Jung-un – mastering engineer (on "Knock Knock (Japanese ver.)", "Signal (Japanese ver.)", "Knock Knock" and "Signal")
 Dave Kutch – mastering engineer (on "Like Ooh-Ahh")
 Chris Gehringer – mastering engineer (on "Cheer Up" and "TT")
 Will Quinnell – assistant mastering engineer (on "TT")

Locations

Recording
 JYPE Studios, Seoul, South Korea
 Kairos Music Group, Los Angeles, California ("Signal (Japanese ver.)" and "Signal")

Mixing
 JYPE Studios, Seoul, South Korea (all songs except "Signal (Japanese ver.)" and "Signal")
 Mirrorball Studios, North Hollywood, California ("Signal (Japanese ver.)" and "Signal")

Mastering
 JFS Mastering, Seoul, South Korea ("Like Ooh-Ahh (Japanese ver.)", "Cheer Up (Japanese ver.)", "TT (Japanese ver.)")
 Sonic Korea, Seoul, South Korea ("Knock Knock (Japanese ver.)" and "Knock Knock")
 Honey Butter, Seoul, South Korea ("Signal (Japanese ver.)" and "Signal")
 The Mastering Palace, New York City, New York ("Like Ooh-Ahh")
 Sterling Sound, New York City, New York ("Cheer Up" and "TT")

Charts

Weekly charts

Year-end charts

Certifications

Accolades

References

Twice (group) albums
Warner Music Japan compilation albums
2017 compilation albums
Japanese-language compilation albums